WGLR-FM (97.7 FM) is a radio station broadcasting a country music format. Licensed to Lancaster, Wisconsin, United States.  The station is currently owned by Morgan Murphy Media and features programming from ABC Radio .

History
The station went on the air as WAXL on August 17, 1981.  On September 1, 1990, the station changed its call sign to the current WGLR-FM. WGLR-FM's music director, Ryan McCall was named "2015 Reporter of the Year" by Music Row magazine during their "Country Breakout Awards" in Nashville.

References

External links

Morgan Murphy Media stations
GLR-FM
Country radio stations in the United States